The VRT 300 — is an unmanned helicopter, that was introduced on MAKS airshow in 2017.

It was constructed for arctic ice patrols in support of safe maritime navigation. Another version of the VRT300, Opticvision, boasts an increased range of flight for monitoring and remote probing.

Specifications 

 Maximum take-off weight: 300 kg;
 Maximum speed: 180 km/h; 
 Operation radius: 150 km; 
 Payload weight: 70 kg; 
 Duration of the flight: 5 hrs; 
 Maximum range of communication with line of sight at flight altitude: 100 km.

See also 
VRT 500
Kamov Ka-137

References 

2010s Russian aircraft